Hyperaspis chapini, or Chapin's sigil lady beetle, is a species of helesius, hyperaspidius, hyperaspis, and thalassa in the family Coccinellidae. It is found in North America.

References

Further reading

 
 
 
 

Coccinellidae